Oxavia Aldiano or better known as Vidi Aldiano (born in Jakarta, Indonesia on March 29, 1990) is an Indonesian singer, musician and songwriter of Javanese and Minangkabau descent.

Background 

Vidi was raised in a family that highly appreciated music. His father, Harry Kiss, was an owner of a famous event organizer business. His mother was a piano teacher. As a result of her teachings, Vidi could play the piano since he was 3 years old.
 
At the age of 2, he won second place at a singing competition for children. In elementary school, Vidi was chosen to be the art ambassador of his school.

In his teenage years, Vidi began to focus on the violin. In high school, Vidi joined a band and won first place in the 1ncredible Band Festival 2007 with his band mates.

Vidi's career as an artist began when his father, realizing how talented his son was, promoted Vidi's demo album to some owners of recording companies that he knew. Unfortunately, the demo album was rejected because male soloists were not popular at that time. After being rejected six times by various recording companies, in 2009 music producer Lala Hamid agreed to produce Vidi's single after watching him sing at an occasion.

The recording company Trinity Optima Production helped Vidi release his third album Yang Kedua with hit single Datang dan Kembali and Gadis Genit.

Discography 
 Pelangi di Malam Hari (2008)
 Lelaki Pilihan (2009)
 Yang Kedua (2011)
 Persona (2016)

Education 
 Al Azhar 4 Elementary School (1996–2002)
 Al Azhar 3 Junior High (2002–2005)
 Al Azhar 1 High School (2005–2008)
 Pelita Harapan University, Management major (2009–2013)
 Berklee College of Music
 University of Manchester (2013–2014)

References

External links 
 

1990 births
21st-century Indonesian male singers
Indonesian pop singers
Singers from Jakarta
Living people
Pelita Harapan University alumni